Inertial Stellar Compass (ISC) is an instrument concept for an advanced navigation system designed to allow spacecraft of the future to operate more autonomously.

The ISC is small in size and consumes low power to operate. ISC is a proposed instrument of NASA, part of New Millennium program's Space Technology 6 project, and currently under development at Charles Stark Draper Laboratory.

The instrument functions with a combination of a miniaturized star tracker and gyroscopes. It uses a wide field-of-view active pixel star camera and a micro electromechanical system to determine the real-time stellar attitude (orientation) of the spacecraft.

See also
TacSat-2

References 

New Millennium Program
Spacecraft instruments